Longstone are an experimental, electronic music collective formed in 1996 in Cheltenham, England, coalescing around the core duo of Mike Ward and Mike Cross.

History 
Longstone were formed during 1996 by Mike Cross and Mike Ward in Cheltenham, England. Longstone released their debut album, Surrounded By Glass, on the Ochre label in 1997. That same year, the band appeared at the CMJ music festival in New York; the performance was recorded and later released in 1998 as the Live in New York 10" mini album. The band's second studio album, Auto//:Genous, was released on former Spacemen 3 member Sonic Boom's U.K.-based Space Age Recordings label and featured  Echo & the Bunnymen guitarist Will Sergeant and the Christians' Henry Priestman guesting on marimba. Longstone's fourth release for Ochre was Static, which was issued in 2001. Its fifth full-length, L.I.F.E.span, was a sound collage that blended analog synths and electronic toys with found sounds, live recordings, samples, and acoustic instruments. The Rmeixes (sic) and Kabuki albums were released in 2007 and 2008 respectively along with an edit of Kabuki also making it onto the Wire Tapper 17 CD - part of a series of CDs released by The Wire magazine. In 2009 Longstone performed a live re-score for Osbert Parkers BAFTA nominated short film Film Noir as part of the Future Shorts Festival in Brixton, London.

In 2011 Ward and Cross formed the Wavetable record label. The label is a vehicle for further Longstone releases along with releases for other, like minded musicians. To date two Longstone albums have been released on Wavetable (Sakura 2011 and Pavilion 2012) as well as Flying Down Trio's, Sheffield and Robson and Wilding's, Chapel Songs.

When Longstone perform live, the duo of Cross and Ward are joined by Chris Cundy (Guillemots, Gannets, Cold Specks), Stuart Wilding (Keith Tippett, Lol Coxhill) and Kev Fox (90 Degrees South, Brickwerk). Will Sergeant has also occasionally assisted. Longstone have also collaborated with Paul Simpson of Skyray (ex-Teardrop Explodes and Wild Swans) and both Ward and Cross have participated in a Welsh-based collective called the Serpents (along with Sergeant and various members of Gorky's Zygotic Mynci, Super Furry Animals, Skyray, Land of Nod, and others). A performance at the Cheltenham Jazz Festival in 2009 also saw Longstone joined by Dutch improvisational cellist and long time Werner Herzog collaborator Ernst Reijseger

Musical style 
Longstone's music is often described as being directly influenced by early-'70s Krautrock bands (Cluster, Neu!, Kraftwerk), as well as more recent Teutonic artists, including To Rococo Rot, and Kreidler. Descriptions like these usually tend to forget  Longstone's avant-rock side or its wide range of Space rock and shoegazer influences, especially My Bloody Valentine and Experimental Audio Research. There is also a strong improvised element to Longstone's sound, particularly in a live context. Later releases and performances have seen the electronic backbone of the sound augmented with more acoustic flavours including woodwind and found percussion.

Discography

Studio albums

Live albums

Singles and EPs

Compilation albums

External links 
 
Wavetable website
 Linear Obsessional Records website
 
 

English electronic music groups
Musical groups established in 1996
British experimental musical groups